The year 2005 is the 13th year in the history of the Ultimate Fighting Championship (UFC), a mixed martial arts promotion based in the United States. In 2005 the UFC held 10 events beginning with, UFC 51: Super Saturday. The reality TV series The Ultimate Fighter and the first UFC Ultimate Fight Night both premiered on Spike TV. The Ultimate Fighter 1 Finale was the first live UFC broadcast on non-pay-per-view television.

Title fights

The Ultimate Fighter

Debut UFC fighters

The following fighters fought their first UFC fight in 2005:

 Alessio Sakara
 Alex Karalexis
 Alex Schoenauer
 Ansar Chalangov
 Bill Mahood
 Bobby Southworth
 Brad Imes
 Branden Lee Hinkle
 Brandon Vera
 Brian Gassaway
 Brock Larson
 Chael Sonnen
 Charles McCarthy
 Chris Leben
 Chris Sanford
 Diego Sanchez
 Drew Fickett
 Fabiano Scherner
 Forrest Griffin
 Gabriel Gonzaga

 Gideon Ray
 James Irvin
 Jason Miller
 Jason Thacker
 Jeff Newton
 Joe Stevenson
 John Marsh
 Jon Fitch
 Jonathan Goulet
 Josh Burkman
 Josh Koscheck
 Josh Neer
 Josh Rafferty
 Keigo Kunihara
 Keith Jardine
 Keith Wisniewski
 Kenny Florian
 Kerry Schall
 Kevin Jordan
 Kit Cope

 Lodune Sincaid
 Luke Cummo
 Marcio Cruz
 Marcus Davis
 Melvin Guillard
 Mike Swick
 Nate Marquardt
 Nate Quarry
 Nick Thompson
 Paul Buentello
 Pete Sell
 Rashad Evans
 Ron Faircloth
 Sam Hoger
 Sam Morgan
 Sean Gannon
 Spencer Fisher
 Stephan Bonnar
 Terry Martin
 Thiago Alves

Events list

UFC Ultimate Fight Night

UFC Ultimate Fight Night (also known as UFC Fight Night 1) was an event held on August 6, 2005 at the Cox Pavilion in Las Vegas, Nevada. The event, aired on Spike, was the first UFC Fight Night event.

Results

See also
 List of UFC champions
 List of UFC events

References

Ultimate Fighting Championship by year
2005 in mixed martial arts